Truman's Place is a historic home located at Hughesville, Charles County, Maryland, United States. It is a -story brick structure with a smaller two-story brick wing built in the mid-19th century. The house incorporates the brick shell of a 1770, one-story, five-bay dwelling with a kitchen-service wing. Outbuildings include a tenant house with an attached stable, a tobacco barn, a garden shed, and a three-bay garage. The home takes its name from a  proprietary manor grant to Nathaniel Truman in 1666.

Truman's Place was listed on the National Register of Historic Places in 1988.

References

External links
 including photo from 1987, at Maryland Historical Trust

Houses in Charles County, Maryland
Houses on the National Register of Historic Places in Maryland
Houses completed in 1770
National Register of Historic Places in Charles County, Maryland
1770 establishments in Maryland